Emanuel de Croÿ-Solre, Duke of Croy (23 June 1718 - 30 March 1784) was a French soldier of the 18th century who attained the rank of Marshal of France.

The only son of Philippe-Alexandre-Emmanuel de Croy, he was born a prince of the Holy Roman Empire.  After the attempted assassination of King Louis XV by Robert-François Damiens, he was sent to Artois, to investigate and reconstruct the route of the assassin.  He was raised to the rank of Marshal of France on 13 June 1783 and he died in Paris on 30 March 1784 at the age of sixty-six.

External link

1718 births
1784 deaths
18th-century French people
18th-century soldiers
French soldiers
Emmanuel De Croy-Solre